Fukien can refer to
 Fujian, a province of the People's Republic of China
 Fujian Province, Republic of China, a province of the Republic of China (Taiwan)
 Fukien AC, an athletics club in Hong Kong

See also
 Hokkien (disambiguation)